Coly is a village in the Dordogne department, in France.

Coly may also refer to:
 Mousebird, a group of birds
 Ferdinand Coly (born 1973), Senegalese footballer
 Matar Coly (born 1984), Senegalese footballer
 River Coly, a river in the county of Devon, England
 Tim Coly, German rugby union player